Plotkin is a surname of Russian Jewish origin, which indicates a person from Plotki, a name of several villages in Russia, Belarus, and Ukraine. It may also refer to:

Alice Playten (1947–2011), born Alice Plotkin, American actress and singer
Andrew Plotkin (born 1970), American writer
Brian Plotkin (born 1984), American soccer player
Chuck Plotkin, American record producer
Diana Plotkin, American political activist
Faith Plotkin (born 1947), American writer 
Gabriel Plotkin, Melvin Capital CEO
Gordon Plotkin (born 1946), British computer scientist
Gregory Plotkin, American film editor and director
Hal Plotkin (born 1957), American journalist and public servant
James Plotkin (born 1970), American guitarist
Joshua B. Plotkin, Evolutionary biologist and applied mathematician
Mark Plotkin (born 1955), American botanist
Stanley Plotkin (born 1932), American physician, vaccinologist, and immunologist
Tom Plotkin, American actor

See also
Plotkin bound, a mathematical limit in coding theory
14619 Plotkin, asteroid
Płotka

Jewish surnames
Russian-language surnames
Surnames of Belarusian origin